Moshe Sternbuch (or Moishe / Moses Shternbuch) is a Haredi rabbi. He serves as the Ra'avad (Chief) of the Edah HaChareidis, vice-president of the Rabbinical Court in Jerusalem, and the rabbi of the Gra Synagogue in the Har Nof neighbourhood.

Early life  
Moshe Sternbuch was born on 15 February 1926 (24 Shevat) in London, one of 9 children of Osher Sternbuch, an Orthodox Jewish merchant, and Devorah. His parents hosted numerous rabbis who came to London to raise money for their yeshivas, among them Elchonon Wasserman, who after learning with Sternbuch declared that he was a davar sheyeish bo mamash (a boy of substance). He was tested in learning every Shabbat by Yechezkel Abramsky, who predicted he would one day become a moreh hora'ah (posek). Before long he was known as the Londoner Illui (prodigy).
Osher died in 1939 at the age of 39, leaving behind his eldest child of 18 years, the 10-year-old Sternbuch, and the youngest only two. In 1940, he entered the Toras Emes yeshiva in Stamford Hill, of which Moshe Schneider was the rosh yeshiva, where he would remain for ten years. He studied there with Bezalel Rakow, who was later to become the Gateshead Rov, Yitzchok Tuvia Weiss, his future colleague in the Edah HaChareidis, and future Olympia and York businessman Paul Reichmann.
 

Sternbuch's family fled London during  World War II due to The Blitz. They moved to a small nearby village where he shared a room with Eliyahu Eliezer Dessler, author of Michtav me-Eliyahu, who predicted that Sternbuch would someday be one of the gedolei hador (greatest of the generation).
  
Due to the increasing threat of a Nazi invasion of Britain, Sternbuch's mother made attempts to arrange his safe passage to Canada or the United States. She asked Elyah Lopian, a rosh yeshiva from the East End of London, for advice on whether or not to allow her son to board what was to be the last passenger ship sailing for America till the war's end. Lopian offered to perform a goral haGra to divine the move's possibility for success, but as he was unable to accompany the solemn ceremony that day with the required fasting, the ship departed without Sternbuch, only to sink with 300 children aboard.

Rabbinic career

After the war, Sternbuch decided to travel to the Land of Israel via France and Italy to study the Torah as taught in the Brisk yeshiva. He enrolled in the Hebron Yeshiva, simultaneously cultivating relationships with leading rabbis Yitzchok Zev Soloveitchik (in 1952), Avrohom Yeshaya Karelitz (the Chazon Ish) and Dov Berish Weidenfeld, all of whom he used to meet with regularly in their homes. 

After their marriage in 1954, the Sternbuchs moved to an apartment in Jerusalem next to Soloveitchik. The young Sternbuch was appointed rosh yeshiva of Yeshivas Hamasmidim there. In 1960, after Soloveitchik's death, they moved to Bnei Brak, where they were to reside for the next 20 years. Yechezkel Abramsky urged Sternbuch to devote himself to strengthening Torah study in Rosh HaAyin, a nearby town with a substantial Yemenite Jewish immigrant population. Foregoing an opportunity to establish an elite kollel in Bnei Brak, he established one in Rosh HaAyin instead.

In 1980, Sternbuch took up a position in Johannesburg, South Africa. He was very involved in outreach there, including his noted lectures to those in the medical field, leaving a deep impression on many people. When he later moved to Jerusalem, many of these South Africans joined him in his new location in the Har Nof neighbourhood. 

Sternbuch currently serves as the Vice-President of the Rabbinical Court and the Ra'avad (Chief) of the Edah HaChareidis in Jerusalem. He resides in the Har Nof neighbourhood, where he is the rabbi of the local Gra Synagogue, named after the Vilna Gaon of whom he is a direct descendant.

Personal life 
In 1954, Sternbuch married the daughter of Yaakov Schechter, an acquaintance of the Chazon Ish. Meshulam Dovid Soloveitchik and Chanoch Ehrentreu were his brothers-in-law.

Opinions 
Sternbuch strongly opposes secular Zionism and was against Israel's establishment. He is of the view that there is a strong connection between the existence of a Jewish state and the beginning of the redemption of the Jewish People to the Land of Israel which will precede the Messianic Era.

In September 2018, Sternbuch blasted  British Chief Rabbi Ephraim Mirvis for publishing an educational pamphlet warning against LGBT bullying in Orthodox schools. Sternbuch viewed this move as advocacy for the LGBT lifestyle. A charge adamantly denied by the Chief Rabbi.

Published works 
 - Commentary on the Jewish holidays
 - Commentary on the Torah
 - Commentary on the Passover haggadah
 - Questions and answers on the Shulchan Aruch

 - Laws of the home

 - Laws and customs of the Vilna Gaon
 - Laws of writing a sefer torah, tefillin, and mezuzah.
]
]
].

References

Sources   
 Frankfurter, Yitzchok (28 March 2018) "From One Generation to Another: A Conversation with the Renowned Posek and Rosh Beis Din of Yerushalayim Rav Moshe Sternbuch", Ami Magazine. Issue 361, pp. 42-68.

1928 births
20th-century rabbis in Jerusalem
21st-century rabbis in Jerusalem
English Orthodox Jews
British emigrants to South Africa
Haredi rabbis in Israel
South African Orthodox rabbis
Rabbis of the Edah HaChareidis
Orthodox Jewish outreach
Anti-Zionist Haredi rabbis
Living people